Asela Jayasinghe (born 23 August 1974) is a Sri Lankan former first-class cricketer who played for Chilaw Marians Cricket Club.

See also
 List of Chilaw Marians Cricket Club players

References

External links
 

1974 births
Living people
Sri Lankan cricketers
Chilaw Marians Cricket Club cricketers
Colombo Cricket Club cricketers
Matara Sports Club cricketers
People from Ragama